Kerry O'Brien is the name of:

 Kerry O'Brien (athlete) (born 1946), Australian steeple chaser and long-distance runner
 Kerry O'Brien (journalist) (born 1945), Australian journalist and TV presenter
 Kerry O'Brien (politician) (born 1951), Australian politician, Senator for Tasmania